This is a list of countries and dependencies by population. It includes sovereign states, inhabited dependent territories and, in some cases, constituent countries of sovereign states, with inclusion within the list being primarily based on the ISO standard ISO 3166-1. For instance, the United Kingdom is considered a single entity, while the constituent countries of the Kingdom of the Netherlands are considered separately. In addition, this list includes certain states with limited recognition not found in ISO 3166-1. Also given in a percentage is each country's population compared with the world population, which the United Nations estimates at  7.954 billion .

Method

Figures used in this chart are based on the most up-to-date estimates or projections by the national census authority, where available, and are usually rounded off.

Where updated national data are not available, figures are based on the estimates or projections for 2022 by the Population Division of the United Nations Department of Economic and Social Affairs.

Because the compiled figures are not collected at the same time in every country, or at the same level of accuracy, the resulting numerical comparisons may create misleading conclusions. Furthermore, the addition of figures from all countries may not equal the world total.

Areas that form integral parts of sovereign states, such as the countries of the United Kingdom, are counted as part of the sovereign states concerned. Not included are other entities, such as the European Union, that are not sovereign states, and independent territories that do not have permanent populations, such as various countries' claims to Antarctica.

Sovereign states and dependencies by population

Note: A numbered rank is assigned to the 193 member states of the United Nations, plus the two observer states to the United Nations General Assembly. Dependent territories and constituent countries that are parts of sovereign states are not assigned a numbered rank. In addition, sovereign states with limited recognition are included, but not assigned a number rank.

Notes

References

Pages using left with no arguments
Countries and dependencies by population
Lists of countries by continent
Lists of countries by continent, by population
Eurasia
Africa
Americas
Oceania